The 11th edition of the annual Holland Ladies Tour was held from September 2 to September 7, 2008. The women's stage race with an UCI rating of 2.2 started in Hellendoorn, and ended in Berg en Terblijt.

Stages

2008-09-03: Hellendoorn — Hellendoorn (109.5 km)

2008-09-03: Hellendoorn — Hellendoorn (20.5 km)

2008-09-04: Leek — Roden (113.2 km)

2008-09-05: Dedemsvaart — Hardenberg (85.2 km)

2008-09-06: Boxtel — Boxtel (121.5 km)

2008-09-07: Valkenburg — Berg en Terblijt (116.7 km)

Final standings

General Classification

Points Classification

Mountains Classification

Best Young Rider Classification

Sprint Classification

Most Aggressive Rider Classification

References 
 cyclingnews
 live-radsport

2008
Holland Ladies Tour
Holland Ladies Tour
Cycling in Groningen (province)
Cycling in North Brabant
Cycling in Overijssel
Cycling in Hellendoorn
Cycling in Noordenveld
Cycling in Valkenburg aan de Geul
Sport in Boxtel
Sport in Hardenberg
Sport in Westerkwartier (municipality)